Hacheston Halt railway station was a station located in Hacheston, Suffolk situated on the Framlingham Branch.

The branch was opened in 1859, but Hacheston Halt was not opened until 1922 in an attempt by the Great Eastern Railway to improve the passenger receipts on the branch. Hacheston Halt was a very basic station and did not even possess a platform so passengers had to use a ladder to get on and off the trains that called at the station.

The station was served by trains that operated between Framlingham and Wickham Market; Withdrawal of passenger services in November, 1952.

References

External links
 Hacheston Halt station on navigable 1946 O. S. map

Disused railway stations in Suffolk
Former Great Eastern Railway stations
Railway stations in Great Britain opened in 1922
Railway stations in Great Britain closed in 1952